Something More Than Free is the fifth studio album by Jason Isbell, released on July 17, 2015. It was produced by Dave Cobb, who had produced Isbell's previous record, Southeastern (2013). At the 58th Annual Grammy Awards, the album won the award for Best Americana Album, and the song "24 Frames" won the award for Best American Roots Song.

Reception

The album received mostly positive reviews. On Metacritic, it has a score of 87 out of 100 based on 25 reviews, indicating "universal acclaim."

Jon Freeman of Nash Country Weekly gave the album a grade of "A" and wrote that "Jason Isbell has a reporter's eye for detail and a poet's gift for a beautifully crafted turn of phrase". He went on to say that "Jason's throaty rasp, not unlike Tyler Farr's, is the ideal vehicle for those stories [...] It may not be all pretty, but Something More Than Free is as real as it gets." Craig Manning of AbsolutePunk praised the album, writing: "Like Southeastern, Something More Than Free is a masterwork, and while I'm not sure if I quite agree with Isbell that it's better than Southeastern, it certainly offers a different (but equally satisfying) experience." In another positive review that compared the album to its predecessor, Eric Swedlund of The A.V. Club wrote that, "though Something More Than Free may not repeat Isbell's album-of-the-year accolades, it continues the magic of that breakthrough LP".

Jeremy Winograd of Slant Magazine wrote, in an otherwise positive review, that Something More Than Free "retains Southeastern'''s intimate acoustic-based feel and heavyhearted lyrical matter, but it's even more smooth-edged and lacks the emotional gut-punches of its predecessor." In a mixed review, Stephen Deusner of Pitchfork described Something More Than Free as "an album that contains too few surprises", and said that "the music does little to distinguish these characters or enliven the lyrics".

Accolades

Commercial performance
In the United States, the album debuted at number 6 on the Billboard 200, and at number 1 on Billboard's Top Rock Albums, Folk Albums, and Top Country Albums charts, with 46,000 units sold. Although he had previously had critical success in the Americana genre, this was the first time one of Isbell's albums had performed so well on the charts across several genres. As of July 2016, the album had sold 143,000 copies in the U.S.

The single "24 Frames" peaked at number 8 on the Billboard'' Triple A Airplay chart, and at number 42 on the Rock Airplay chart.

Track listing

Personnel
 Jason Isbell – vocals, electric guitar, slide guitar, acoustic guitar, hi-string acoustic guitar, nylon string guitar, resonator guitar
 Dave Cobb – percussion, acoustic guitar
 Derry Deborja – piano, mellotron, organ, synthesizer, Wurlitzer
 Chad Gamble – drums
 Jimbo Hart – bass guitar
 Amanda Shires – fiddle, strings, harmony vocals
 Sadler Vaden – electric guitar, background vocals

Charts

Weekly charts

Year-end charts

References

External links
Jason Isbell official website

Jason Isbell albums
2015 albums
Albums produced by Dave Cobb
Grammy Award for Best Americana Album